"Boom Boom (Let's Go Back to My Room)" is the debut single by American singer and model Paul Lekakis. Released in 1987 on ZYX Records, then picked up by Polydor Records for a wider release, the song peaked at number 43 on the US Billboard Hot 100, number six on the Billboard Hot Dance Club Play chart and number 60 on the UK Singles Chart. The single fared better in other parts of the world, staying at number one for five weeks on the Australian Music Report and for three weeks on South Africa's Springbok Radio chart. It also peaked at number four in Canada and number seven in New Zealand.

In 1990 the song was included on Lekakis' first album, Tattoo It, which was released on Sire Records. Subsequent remixes have appeared on the US dance chart. The song is popular in the LGBT community and helped to establish his career, both as a singer and as an actor. In 2009, VH1 ranked "Boom Boom" number 83 on its program 100 Greatest One Hit Wonders of the 80s.

Remixes
"Boom Boom" has since been re-released and remixed on multiple occasions.  In 2007, a music video was also released to celebrate the 20th anniversary of the original single.

In an interview conducted by Ben Patrick Johnson, from his video blog Life on the Left Coast, Lekakis stated that the 2007 version is the first in which he participated in the remix process, including re-recording his vocals, there is one slight lyrical difference between the 2007 remix and the original song: instead of "...coming back to my room for a little boom boom", the lyrics in the more recent version are "...coming back to my room for another boom boom".

Promotion
Lekakis lip synced the song on various programs, some of which have been shown on YouTube. In addition, Lekakis appeared in an episode of an MTV program produced by Andy Warhol, Andy Warhol's Fifteen Minutes, singing the song in 1987.

Charts

Weekly charts

Year-end charts

Certifications

Cover versions
 Japanese female group Spinning Dee-Dee recorded a Japanese-language cover of the song in 1987.
 Japanese pop star Naoko Isamu also covered it in 1987.
 Turkish singer Seden Gürel covered the song in Turkish as "Bum Bum" in 1992.
 Synthpop group Freezepop covered the song in 2001 as "Seven Boom Medley", which combines the song with The Vengaboys' "Boom, Boom, Boom, Boom".

See also
List of number-one singles in Australia during the 1980s

References

External links
Single release data at discogs.com

1987 songs
1987 debut singles
Paul Lekakis songs
ZYX Music singles
Polydor Records singles
Song recordings produced by Ric Wake
LGBT-related songs
Number-one singles in Australia
Number-one singles in South Africa